Rogelio Martínez (born 16 July 1974 in Cotuí, Sánchez Ramírez) is a retired professional boxer from the Dominican Republic, who was nicknamed "The Golden Warrior" during his career.

As an amateur, Martínez represented his native country in the light welterweight division (– 63.5 kg), winning a silver medal at the 1993 Central American and Caribbean Games in Ponce, Puerto Rico. Rated as a middleweight he made his professional debut on 24 April 1997, defeating USA's Darrell Jacobs in Philadelphia, Pennsylvania. He retired after 19 pro bouts (13 wins, 5 losses and 1 draw).

References 
 
 sports-reference

1974 births
Living people
Bantamweight boxers
Boxers at the 1995 Pan American Games
Boxers at the 1996 Summer Olympics
Olympic boxers of the Dominican Republic
Dominican Republic male boxers
Central American and Caribbean Games silver medalists for the Dominican Republic
Competitors at the 1993 Central American and Caribbean Games
Central American and Caribbean Games medalists in boxing
Pan American Games competitors for the Dominican Republic